Giusep Nay (born 9 August 1942 in Trun, Grisons) was the president of the Federal Supreme Court of Switzerland for the years 2005 and 2006. He was elected to the Supreme Court in 1988 after being nominated by the Christian Democratic People's Party of Switzerland.

Nay resigned his office in 2006. Together with former MP Lili Nabholz and law professor Giorgio Malinverni, he was nominated by the Swiss government to replace Luzius Wildhaber as the Swiss judge at the European Court of Human Rights. Eventually, Malinverni was elected to succeed Wildhaber.

External links
Official biography

1942 births
Living people
20th-century Swiss judges
Federal Supreme Court of Switzerland judges
Judges of the European Court of Human Rights
21st-century Swiss judges
Swiss judges of international courts and tribunals